Kirengeshoma koreana, the Korean kirengeshoma, is a plant in the family Hydrangeaceae.

Description
Kirengeshoma koreana is a herbaceous plant with opposite, simple, palmately lobed leaves, on stout, green stems. The flowers are yellow, borne in midsummer.

References

Hydrangeaceae